Hedong is a town of Donghe District, in the southeastern outskirts of Baotou, Inner Mongolia, People's Republic of China, it has two residential communities and 26 villages under its administration.

See also
List of township-level divisions of Inner Mongolia

References

Township-level divisions of Inner Mongolia
Baotou